Mississippi County Airport  is a public use airport in Mississippi County, Missouri, United States. It is owned by the Mississippi County Commission and located four nautical miles (5 mi, 7 km) south of the central business district of Charleston, Missouri.

Although many U.S. airports use the same three-letter location identifier for the FAA and IATA, this airport is assigned CHQ by the FAA but has no designation from the IATA, (which assigned CHQ to Chania International Airport serving Chania, Greece).

Facilities and aircraft 
Mississippi County Airport covers an area of 100 acres (40 ha) at an elevation of 313 feet (95 m) above mean sea level. It has one runway designated 18/36 with an asphalt surface measuring 3,196 by 60 feet (974 x 18 m). For the 12-month period ending June 30, 2009, the airport had 1,215 aircraft operations, an average of 101 per month: 99% general aviation and 1% military.

References

External links 
 Mississippi County Airport at Missouri DOT Airport Directory
 Aerial image as of March 1996 from USGS The National Map
 
 

Airports in Missouri
Buildings and structures in Mississippi County, Missouri